Bajura District, a part of Sudurpashchim Province, is one of the seventy-seven districts of Nepal.

The annual rainfall is about 13,433 mm and temperatures vary from 0 °C to 40 °C. The livelihood of more than 80% of the district population depends on agriculture farming, mainly small scale livestock. Due to low level of agricultural production, the majority of the households face acute food shortages for a large part of the year. According to the National Census 2011, the total population of the district is 134,912 comprising 69,106 female (51%) and 65,806 male (49%) residing in 24,908 households. Bajura district has an average population density of around 62 people per square km. The average family size is 5.4. Life expectancy of the people is 58 years. The average literacy rate is about 32%. Bajura district has a multi ethnic composition with Chhetri, Kami, Thakuri, Brahman, Damai, SarkI and Sanyashi (Giri and Puri). The common language is Nepali (96%) followed by Bhote Sherpa (0.46%) and Tamang (0.42%). Although accessibility to Bajura is very poor, this is improving rapidly. The Government strategy is mainly focused on the connection of VDC headquarters with all-weather motor able roads to SRN or District headquarters. Moreover, the DDC body of Bajura district has given higher priority on rural roads.

Geography and Climate
The district has nine municipalities, 9 Ilakas (administrative areas) and 1 constituency areas. The district is situated in Longitude between 81° 10′ 20″ to 81° 48′ 27″ East and Latitude 29° 16′ 21″ to 29° 56′ 56″ North. Geographically the district is divided in three distinct regions from north to south viz. Higher Himalayan Region, Higher Mountain and mid – Mountains. The Higher Himalayan region comprises Saipal Himalayan range; High Mountain region comprises Doha Lekh and Ghori Lekh. Similarly, Mid-Mountain range comprises different ranges of mountains e.g. Badimalika Temple. The District has started from 300m to 6400m in height.

Demographics
At the time of the 2011 Nepal census, Bajura District had a population of 134,912. Of these, 99.2% spoke Nepali, 0.5% Sherpa, 0.1% Tamang and 0.1% other languages as their first language.

In terms of ethnicity/caste, 57.8% were Chhetri, 9.8% Kami, 7.0% Hill Brahmin, 5.2% Thakuri, 5.0% Sarki, 4.2% Damai/Dholi, 3.9% Lohar, 2.4% Sanyasi/Dasnami, 1.4% Badi, 1.0% Bhote, 0.9% other Dalit, 0.3% Kumal, 0.2% Teli, 0.1% Limbu, 0.1% Magar, 0.1% Mallaha, 0.1% Musalman, 0.1% Tamang, 0.1% other Terai, 0.1% Tharu and 0.2% others.

In terms of religion, 98.7% were Hindu, 1.1% Buddhist, 0.1% Christian and 0.1% Muslim,

In terms of literacy, 55.4% could read and write, 2.5% could only read and 42.1% could neither read nor write.

Administration
The district consists of nine municipalities, out of which four are urban municipalities and five are rural municipalities. These are as follows:
 Badimalika Municipality
 Triveni Municipality
 Budhiganga Municipality
 Budhinanda Municipality
 Gaumul Rural Municipality
 Jagnnath Rural Municipality
 Swamikartik Khapar Rural Municipality
 Chhededaha Rural Municipality
 Himali Rural Municipality

Former Village Development Committees 
Prior to the restructuring of the district, Bajura District consisted of the following Village development committees:

Atichaur
Baddhu
Bahrabis
Bichhiya
Bramhatola
Budhiganga
Chhatara
Dahakot
Dogadi
Gotri
Gudukhati
Jagannath
Jayabageshwari
Jugada
Kailashmandau
Kanda
Kolti
Kotila
Kuldeumadau
Manakot
Martadi
Pandusain
Rugin
Sappata
Tolidewal
Wai
Jukot

Health care
The small health centres in many VDCs are without Auxiliary Health Workers (AHWs), Auxiliary Nurse Midwives (ANMs) and Community Health Workers (CHWs). Primary or normal treatment can be done in the district headquarters and also in Bayalpata Hospital of neighbouring district Accham while people seeking severe cases have to travel a long distance to Kathmandu or other major cities or end up dying because of lack of treatment. Many people still believe in Dhami and Jhakri and do not always seek medical or go to the hospital for treatment. An NGO, PHASE Nepal provides many health care facilities and training programs to six VDCs: Kolti, Wai, Kotila, Pandusain, Rugin and Bandhu. Many people residing in these VDCs have benefited from the program.

Currently PHASE Nepal is working on several projects in this district including community health and education, livelihood, hygiene, sanitation and diarrhoea mitigation programmes. PHASE Nepal also conduct education programs like teacher training and girls empowerment programme.

Colleges and School in Bajura 
Martadi, Bajura
 Bajura Multiple Campus 
It has been conditioning the bachelor level programs with affiliation to Tribhuwan University, Kirtipur, Kathmandu, Nepal.
 Badimalika English Boarding School
 Converse Academy
 Shree Malika Higher Secondary School
Kolti, Bajura 
 Shree Jana Prakash Higher Secondary School
Naubis, Bajura
 Shree Bhanodaya higher Secondary School
 Badimalika Multiple Campus
It is conducting the Bachelor's level program BBS, BEd & B.A. with affiliation to Tribhuwan University

Triveni, Bajura
 Ratna Higher Secondary School, Seliphal, Bajura.
It was established in 2022 BS, it recently started offering +2 level program in Humanities and Education stream.
 Masteshwori Higher Secondary School, Pandhara, Bajura.
The school is providing plus two level program in Humanities and Education stream.
 Tolidewal Danda Secondary School, Toli, Bajura.
The school is providing plus two level program in Humanities and Education stream.
 Tribhuwaneshwari Secondary School, Chhatara, Bajura.
The school is providing plus two level program in Management and Education stream.
 Shree Parvati Secondary School, Paima, Bajura
 Nateshwori Secondary School, Khripata, Bajura
 Damtha Secondary School, Kailashmandu Bajura
 Bajura Model Academy, Khirpata Bajura

Bahrabis, Bajura
 Shree Trishakti Higher Secondary School, Tallakot, Bajura
The school is providing plus two level education in Management and Education faculty.

Photos of Bajura

References

External links

See also

Martadi

 
Districts of Nepal established in 1962
Populated places in Bajura District